Mystery meat is a disparaging term for meat products, typically ground or otherwise processed, such as burger patties, chicken nuggets, Salisbury steaks, sausages, or hot dogs, that have an unidentifiable source. Most often the term is used in reference to food served in institutional cafeterias, such as prison food or a North American school lunch.

The term is also sometimes applied to meat products where the species from which the meat has come from is known, but the cuts of meat used are unknown. This is often the case where the cuts of meat used include offal and mechanically separated meat, or when non-meat substitutes such as textured vegetable protein are used to stretch the meat, where explicitly stating the type of meat used might diminish the perceived palatability of the product to some purchasers.

Use in marketing
In 2016, Nissin, a Japanese food company that produces Cup Noodles, started to call their ingredients as self-deprecating Nazoniku (literally Mystery Meat) as part of their official marketing campaign.  Nazoniku, or formally known as Daisuminchi (literally Minced Meat Dice), are made from pork, soybeans and other ingredients.

See also

Pink slime
Mystery meat navigation
Chicken McNuggets

References

External links

Fast food
Criticism of fast food
Meat
Pejorative terms related to technology
Ethically disputed business practices